Luigi Lavazza S.p.A., shortened and stylized as LAVAZZA, is an Italian manufacturer of coffee products. Founded in Turin in 1895 by Luigi Lavazza, it was initially run from a small grocery store at Via San Tommaso 10. The business (Italian: S.p.A.) is currently administered by the third and fourth generations of the Lavazza family.

Coffee
Lavazza imports coffee from around the world, including Brazil, Colombia, Guatemala, Costa Rica, Honduras, Uganda, Indonesia, the United States and Mexico.

Branded as "Italy's Favourite Coffee," the company claims that 16 million out of the 20 million coffee-purchasing families in Italy choose Lavazza. Among its offerings today are products such as: Qualità Oro, Qualità Rossa, Club, Caffè Espresso, Il Perfetto Espresso, Caffè Crema, Gran Aroma Bar, Super Crema, Crema e Gusto, Crema e Aroma, Top Class, Grand'Espresso, Dek (decaffeinated) and coffee capsules A Modo Mio, "Espresso Point" and Lavazza Blue. 
Lavazza also produces Nespresso Compatible Capsules (NCC).

Sustainability
Sustainable production concerns have led the company to develop the ¡Tierra! project, a sustainable agriculture program in Honduras, Colombia and Peru, that seeks to improve the quality of coffee as well as the environmental and working conditions of those communities.

Fairtrade
Only 1 out of 10 Lavazza production companies have the fairtrade certification according to their 2020 sustainability report.

Retail
The company operates a number of retail coffee shops ("Il Caffè di Roma" and "Espression"). The shops offer traditional coffee drinks as well as whole bean and ground coffee for home use.

Company

Lavazza, established in Turin, Italy, in 1895, has been owned by the family of the same name for four generations. The world's seventh-ranking coffee roaster, Lavazza has a market share by sales of over 36% in Italy, 3,800 employees and revenue of €2.24 billion (2019). The company has six production sites, three in Italy and three abroad, and operates through associated companies and distributors in more than 90 countries. Lavazza exports 46% of its production. Lavazza credits itself with inventing the concept of blending, "the art of combining different types of coffee from different geographical areas", in its early years and claims this as a distinctive feature of all its products. The company also has 25 years of experience in the production and sale of portioned coffee systems. Today, through ongoing partnerships with an international network of universities and scientific research centers, Lavazza operates four platforms in this segment. In 1979 the company established the "Luigi Lavazza Centre for coffee research" which is "devoted to the study of espresso" and has evolved into the Lavazza Training Centre, a network of over 50 coffee schools worldwide, where 30,000 people receive training each year.

Among the activities promoted by the Lavazza Foundation, established in 2002, is the Tierra project which, in partnership with the Rainforest Alliance, performs research into achieving the "finest end product quality" with a focus on the living conditions of people in coffee producing countries.

Lavazza is the official coffee in the Italian Pavilion at the Expo 2015 in Milan.

Lavazza acquired the Carte Noire and Merrild brands from Jacobs Douwe Egberts in February 2016.

Lavazza purchased an 80% stake in Canadian-based Kicking Horse Coffee in May 2017.

In 2019, with PepsiCo, Lavazza launched canned ready-to-drink cappuccino in Europe.

A lawsuit was filed in 2019 alleging Lavazza brought false intellectual property lawsuits against American resellers on Amazon.com in an attempt to prevent them from reselling products.

In November 2022, it was announced Lavazza has acquired the French coffee roaster, distributor and services supplier, MaxiCoffee.

Sponsorship
Lavazza became a sponsor of Liverpool F.C. in 2018 and the Williams Racing team in Formula One, as they are a personal sponsor with Canadian Nicholas Latifi.
Also through the agreement reached in September 2020, Lavazza became the official coffee brand used by Juventus F.C.

Offices and manufacturing plants
"Luigi Lavazza S.p.A." is present in over 90 countries with more than 20 offices and manufacturing plants in Italy and in the rest of the world. In Turin, in Via Bologna, was recently inaugurated "Nuvola", the new Lavazza Headquarters. The "Nuvola" project is the work of Cino Zucchi Architetti and is at the heart of the recent qualification of the Aurora district. In addition to Turin, Luigi Lavazza S.p.A. has 12 other European offices and is also present in the United States, Australia, South America, India (with two locations) and Morocco.

Currently, the Lavazza Group includes 21 companies and international offices, including the Turinese Headquarter "Nuvola" and San Tommaso 10, the same old store in Via San Tommaso owned by Luigi Lavazza in late 1800.

The Lavazza Group has three main manufacturing plants in Italy: Turin, the first historical manufacturing plant; Gattinara, where Lavazza A Modo Mio, Lavazza Espresso Point and Lavazza Blue capsules are produced; and in Pozzilli where decaffeinated coffee is made for worldwide distribution. Other manufacturing plants are located in France, India, and Brazil.

Calendar

Since 1991, Lavazza has produced the "Lavazza Calendar", featuring fashion photography from some of the world's leading photographers. The calendar is not available for purchase. Contributors have included Annie Leibovitz in 2009, David LaChapelle in 2002, Helmut Newton in 1993 and 1994, Ellen Von Unwerth in 1995, Eugenio Recuenco in 2007, Erwin Olaf in 2005, and Platon in 2018. The calendar has become a showpiece of conceptual fashion photography.

See also

 Single-serve coffee container
 List of Italian companies

References

External links
 Lavazza Official website

 
Advertising campaigns
Promotional calendars
Coffee brands
Food and drink companies established in 1895
Italian companies established in 1895
Coffee companies of Italy
Privately held companies of Italy
Manufacturing companies based in Turin
Companies based in Turin
Italian brands